Alyna is a 2010 Philippine romantic-drama television series loosely based on the PHR pocketbook Dominic created by Martha Cecilia and directed by FM Reyes and Cathy Garcia-Molina and serves as the 13th installment of the Precious Hearts Romances Presents series. The series stars ABS-CBN's Kapamilya Gold Queen Shaina Magdayao in her title role as Alyna Natividad, and Kaye Abad as Lilet Cenarosa-del Carmen, together with leading men Jason Abalos and Sid Lucero, with an ensemble cast consisting of Francine Prieto, Jao Mapa, Beauty Gonzalez, Paul Jake Castillo, Charee Pineda, JM de Guzman, Jose Sarasola, Maria Isabel Lopez, Dionne Monsanto, Bing Davao, Edward Mendez, Andrea Brillantes, and Gloria Sevilla in their supporting roles. The series premiered on ABS-CBN's Hapontastic afternoon block, replacing Precious Hearts Romances Presents: Impostor on its timeslot from September 20, 2010 to February 11, 2011.

Story 
The series revolves on Alyna Natividad the main character in the series after being through hardships she will meet Rex Del Carmen who is the imposterous Dominic Del Carmen when she meets the real Dominic the sibling, who has madness and anger opposite Alyna, both will learn to regain love, and fight for family and their dignity.

Cast

Main cast
Shaina Magdayao as Alyna Natividad - Alyna grew up with no family she could call her own. Following the death of her father, Alyna almost molested by her mother's live-in partner, not long after she started living with them. Her estranged mother may have saved her from the abuse, but she left Alyna with multiple emotional scars to remind her that she is unwanted and that her beauty, her greatest gift, will cause her downfall.
Jason Abalos as Dominic Del Carmen - Dominic del Carmen hails from a wealthy clan. He runs a pottery and other businesses. He is often perceived to be strict and righteous because of his unwavering sense of right and wrong, and his unending need to prove himself to his family and to others.
Kaye Abad as Lilet Cenarosa-Del Carmen - The oldest daughter of Cenarosa clan. She will do everything to get Dominic's love and the cause of Rex and Dominic's rift.
Sid Lucero as Dexter 'Rex' Del Carmen - Rex comes from an aristocratic clan in the province but opted for the indulgent life in the city. He is not accustomed to hard work because everything he wants comes to him easily—including women. Only one woman attempted to resist his charms, Alyna.
Francine Prieto as Aida Natividad / Mira Fuentes - Alyna's mother who leaves her in the beginning of the story and falls for another man after losing comfort in Naldo.

Supporting cast
Jao Mapa as Reynaldo "Naldo" Natividad - He is a paraplegic father of Alyna. He raised her in comfort and showed her how much he loved Aida even though he is paralyzed.
Maria Isabel Lopez as Donya Fausta Del Carmen - Auntie of Rex and Dominic. Who re-claims her name as the Queen of Del Carmen's household even though she is adopted and not the real Del Carmen.
Bing Davao as Paco Alvaro - who helped Alyna from a car accident and has a son, Victor. He also had a secret affair with Alyna's mother, now known as Mira Fuentes and the head manager of Dominic's new job.
Edward Mendez as Victor Alvaro - new love interest of Alyna and has a daughter named Sophia from his previous relationship. He thought that Alyna is the one who broke their family apart, but his hatred slowly changed to deep affection for her.
Beauty Gonzalez as Liza Abadilla - The honest friend of Alyna. A tough Visayan who constantly argues with Patrick.
Charee Pineda as Jacqueline Cenarosa - The tomboyish sister of Lilet. She transformed herself from being a tomboy to a beautiful young lady after she met Yael. She usually finds comfort to Yael whenever she has a problem with her father.
Dionne Monsanto as Arianna - Patrick's previous girlfriend, who wants to ruined the relationships of Lisa and Patrick.
Paul Jake Castillo as Patrick - Dominic and Rex's childhood friend. A veterinarian and a Mama's boy. He usually annoys Liza, but eventually fell in love with her.
JM De Guzman as Yael - He came from a sorrowful past and took good care of his younger sister promising her to have a brighter future, but she died from epilepsy. He is also the man that Jerry finds comfort.
Jose Sarasola as Andrew - He is the attorney of the Del Carmen's, who will do everything to protect the families wealth.
Andrea Brillantes (credited as Blythe Gorostiza) as Sophia - Victor's daughter. She thinks that Alyna is her long lost mother because of the picture frame that she had.
Gloria Sevilla as Susana  - The loving mother of Patrick, who is a Visayan native as well.

Special participation
Nick Lizaso as Don Menandro Cenarosa
Mark Gil as Don Felipe Del Carmen
Susan Africa as Donya Adela Dela Cruz-Del Carmen

Critical reception
On an interview with Shaina Magdayao on The Buzz on December 19, 2010, she said that the show would be extended until February 11, 2011.

See also
Precious Hearts Romances Presents
List of telenovelas of ABS-CBN

References

ABS-CBN drama series
Philippine romance television series
Television shows based on books
2010 Philippine television series debuts
2011 Philippine television series endings
Filipino-language television shows
Television shows set in the Philippines